The acronym APHA may refer to:

American Paint Horse Association, a horse breed registry
American Pharmacists Association (APhA)
American Public Health Association
APHA color, a color standard named for the American Public Health Association
Animal and Plant Health Agency, an executive agency of DEFRA, UK
Apha, a genus of moths in the family Eupterotidae